The Clarksville Police Department is the law enforcement agency of the City of Clarksville, Tennessee.

Organization

Operations Bureau
The Operations Bureau supervises the "Three Districts" that make up the Clarksville Police Department. Units under the command of the Operations Bureau include Uniform Patrol, Traffic Enforcement/Parks, Criminal Investigations, Special Operations Unit and Tactical Team. The Clarksville Police Department has approximately 275 employees. The cities population is approximately 136,000 + as of 2010 and growing.

Administrative Bureau
The Administrative Bureau supervises all support functions of the Clarksville Police Department.

Rank structure

See also

 List of law enforcement agencies in Tennessee

Municipal police departments of Tennessee